Rameez Junaid and Alexander Peya were the defending champions, but decided not to participate.
Im Kyu-tae and Danai Udomchoke won this tournament, defeating Jamie Baker and Vasek Pospisil 6–4, 6–4 in the final.

Seeds

Draw

Draw

References
 Main Draw
 Qualifying Draw

Busan Open Challenger Tennis - Doubles
2011 Doubles